FabricLive.09 is a DJ mix compilation album by Stuart Price, under the moniker Jacques Lu Cont, as part of the FabricLive Mix Series.

Track listing

References

External links
Fabric: FabricLive.09
Allmusic: FabricLive.09 review
Resident Advisor: FabricLive.09 review
Fabric Live Review by The Critique

Stuart Price albums
2003 compilation albums